Eve (stylized as EVE) is the debut studio album of Showta. The album was released on March 5, 2008.

Background and release

Eve is the debut studio album of Showta. The album was released on March 5, 2008 under King Records. The limited edition included a DVD consisting of all music videos released from his first five singles.

Showta described the album as having "different voices", mentioning that he sings from different perspectives in each song, including a "pure-hearted young male protagonist" and a woman. He selected Eve as the title as a reference to Adam and Eve, representing how his performances surpassed gender and allowing him to sing from the sound and perspective of a woman.

Music

Aside from containing new original songs, Eve compiles songs from Showta's previous singles released from 2006 to 2008. His debut single, "Negaiboshi", first released on July 26, 2006, was described as being sung from the perspective of a "pure-hearted young male protagonist." Other singles included "Trans-winter (Fuyu no Mukōgawa)", which was used as the theme song to the live-action television adaptation of Damens Walker; "Hito Shizuku"; "Kimi ni, Kaze ga Fukimasu Yō ni", the ending theme song to Ichiteru!; and a cover of Yoshie Kashiwabara's 1983 song "Haru na no ni."

Along with "Haru na no ni", the album also included cover renditions of other songs, such as Caoli Cano's 1995 song "Gozen Ni-ji no Angel", which Showta's producer had wanted to release after having him do demo recordings of several kayōkyoku songs. "Sausage", which was later re-released as a B-side to Showta's 6th single, "Hikaru no Gen-chan", was described as a "warm R&B song."

Reception

The album debuted at #115 in the Oricon Weekly Albums Chart, charting for one week.

CDJournal described the album as having a "healing effect" and felt that Showta's clear voice suited the elegant and acoustic sound, recommending his cover renditions of "Gozen Ni-ji no Angel" and "Ichikōnen."

Track listing

Charts

Notes

References

Shouta Aoi albums
2008 debut albums